is a Japanese politician serving as prime minister of Japan and president of the Liberal Democratic Party (LDP) since 2021. A member of the House of Representatives, he previously served as Minister for Foreign Affairs from 2012 to 2017 and as acting Minister of Defense in 2017. From 2017 to 2020, he also chaired the LDP Policy Research Council.

Born into a political family, Kishida spent part of his childhood in the United States where he attended elementary school in New York City. After beginning his career in finance, Kishida entered politics and was elected to the House of Representatives in 1993 as a member of the LDP. Kishida was appointed to various posts in the cabinets of prime ministers Shinzo Abe and Yasuo Fukuda from 2007 to 2008, and was appointed Minister for Foreign Affairs in 2012 after Abe regained the premiership following the 2012 general election, serving for five years and becoming the longest-serving Foreign Affairs Minister in Japanese history. Kishida later resigned from the Abe cabinet in 2017 in order to head the LDP's Policy Research Council. Kishida also assumed control of the LDP's Kōchikai faction in 2012 following the retirement of faction boss Makoto Koga.

Long considered a potential future prime minister, Kishida ran in the 2020 LDP leadership election, but lost out to Yoshihide Suga. He ran again for the party leadership in 2021, this time winning in a second round run-off against opponent Taro Kono. Kishida was confirmed as Prime Minister by the National Diet four days later on 4 October 2021 and led the LDP to victory in the 2021 general election later that same month.

Kishida has been described as an ideological moderate within the LDP and has stated that his premiership will focus on a "new model of capitalism", by seeking to implement redistributive policies to expand the middle class. On foreign policy he continued strengthening the Quad Security Dialogue in pursuit of the Free and Open Indo-Pacific strategy. His premiership has seen a political scandal related to LDP links to the Unification Church that came to public attention after the assassination of Shinzo Abe in 2022. In November that year, he instructed the cabinet to increase the military budget to 2% of Japan's GDP, up from 1% previously.

Early life and education 
Kishida was born to a political family in Shibuya, Tokyo, on 29 July 1957. His father Fumitake Kishida was a government official in the Ministry of Economy, Trade and Industry and director of The Small and Medium Enterprise Agency. Since the Kishida family was from Hiroshima, the family returned there every summer. Many members of the Kishida family had died in the atomic bombing and Fumio grew up hearing stories from the atomic bomb survivors. Both his father Fumitake and grandfather Masaki Kishida were former politicians who were members of the House of Representatives. Former Minister of Economy, Trade and Industry Yoichi Miyazawa is his cousin and former prime minister Kiichi Miyazawa is a distant relative.

He went to P.S. 013 Clement C. Moore elementary school in the Elmhurst neighborhood of Queens, New York, because his father was posted to a job in the U.S. at the time. He also attended Kōjimachi Elementary School and Kōjimachi Junior High School. Kishida graduated from Kaisei Academy, where he played on the baseball team.

Following several rejections from the University of Tokyo, Kishida studied law at Waseda University and graduated in 1982. At Waseda, he was friends with future politician Takeshi Iwaya.

Political career 
After working at now-defunct Long-Term Credit Bank of Japan and then as a secretary to a member of the House of Representatives, Kishida was elected to the House of Representatives in the 1993 general election, representing the Hiroshima 1st district.

Kishida served as Minister of Okinawa Affairs from 2007 to 2008, firstly in the Abe Cabinet and later in the Fukuda cabinet. He was appointed state minister in charge of consumer affairs and food safety in the cabinet of then prime minister Yasuo Fukuda in 2008. Kishida was also state minister in charge of science and technology in the Fukuda cabinet.

He was close to Makoto Koga, leader of the Kōchikai faction, one of the oldest inside the LDP, and assumed control of it in October 2012 after Makoto Koga announced his retirement from politics.

Abe government 

Following the LDP's victory in the 2012 general election, Kishida was named foreign minister in the Cabinet of Prime Minister Shinzō Abe on 26 December 2012. He became the longest-serving foreign minister in postwar history, surpassing Abe's father Shintaro Abe. He helped to arrange U.S. President Barack Obama's historic visit to Hiroshima in May 2016, and gained attention in 2017 when he appeared alongside comedian Piko Taro to promote a United Nations  program.

He was not in favor of the appointment of Toshihiro Nikai as LDP secretary-general by Abe in 2016 against the wishes of Kishida's own faction, which was seen as an attempt at blocking generational change inside the LDP.

In 2017, Kishida left the Cabinet to take over the chairmanship of the LDP Policy Research Council, a position traditionally seen as a stepping stone to leadership of the party. He sought this position in order to improve his chances to succeed Abe, as the foreign minister post had relatively little influence within the party.

Kishida considered running in the 2018 LDP presidential election, but he was persuaded by Abe not to run, with a suggestion that Abe would later support Kishida as his successor. By mid-2020, several senior LDP lawmakers had shifted their support from Kishida to Chief Cabinet Secretary Yoshihide Suga. Deputy Prime Minister Taro Aso was also popular for sending stimulus payments to households during the COVID-19 pandemic. Kishida ran in the 2020 LDP presidential election but lost out to Suga, who became prime minister; Kishida was not offered a position in the Suga cabinet, although his faction obtained two cabinet seats.

Prime Minister of Japan (2021-present) 

Following Yoshide Suga’s announcement on 3 September 2021 that he would resign, following low approval ratings (at one point below 30%), and a new wave of COVID-19 infections, Kishida and Taro Kono of Shikōkai faction were in the lead to replace him. Suga’s decision to not seek re-election as head of the LDP, triggered another leadership election in September, just a little more than a year after the previous election in 2020.  Throughout the race, Kono was heavily favored to win as he remained in first place among various LDP polls, and he received endorsements by Suga and others.

On 29 September 2021, Kishida defeated Taro Kono in a runoff vote to become the leader of the ruling Liberal Democratic Party (LDP) and replaced outgoing party leader Yoshihide Suga. He received a total of 257 votes (60.19%), from 249 parliament members and eight rank-and-file members, to become Japan's next prime minister.

2021 general election and Second Cabinet 

The First Kishida Cabinet took office on 4 October 2021 and consisted of 21 members, including 13 who joined the Cabinet for the first time while also including 2 veterans, Toshimitsu Motegi and Nobuo Kishi who retained their respective posts from the previous cabinet under Suga; however, on the same day, Kishida announced he would call a general election for 31 October 2021. Kishida gave his first speech as prime minister on 8 October 2021, vowing to fight and end the COVID-19 pandemic in Japan as well as announcing measures to counter the perceived threats by China and North Korea.

Following the 2021 Japanese general election, Kishida maintained the premiership although the LDP lost 25 seats. He formed the Second Kishida Cabinet by replacing Toshimitsu Motegi with Yoshimasa Hayashi as the Foreign Minister; Motegi became the party's Secretary-General.

Foreign relations

Russian invasion of Ukraine 

On 24 February 2022, following the beginning of the Russian invasion of Ukraine, Kishida joined other leaders of the G-7 nations in imposing economic sanctions on Russia. Kishida's proposed sanctions are much harsher than the largely symbolic sanctions imposed by the government of Shinzo Abe on Russia following the 2014 Russian annexation of Crimea. Liberal Democratic Party leaders fear that a lackluster response by Japan to the Ukrainian crisis will result in a lack of support from Japan's European allies in the event of potential Chinese aggression against Taiwan.

On January 14, 2023, former Russian President Dmitry Medvedev called Kishida to commit "seppuku" after he and Joe Biden warned Russia against using a nuclear weapon in Ukraine. After US President Biden’s visit to Kyiv on 20 February 2023, Kishida is the only G7 leader to have not visited Kyiv in Ukraine.  Kishida invited President Volodymyr Zelenskyy of Ukraine to a virtual meeting of G7 leaders, which was held on 24 February 2023, the one year anniversary of the Russian invasion of Ukraine. The G7 announced it would introduce "new coordinated economic actions" in efforts to support Ukraine.

Group of Seven 
In November 2022, Kishida instructed his government to increase military spending to 2 percent of Japan's GDP, up from 1 percent previously, by 2027. Following this resolution by the cabinet, Kishida began a 5 nation tour of all members of the Group of Seven in January 2023. Kishida first met with President Emanuel Macron of France on 9 January 2023. The following day, he met with Italian Prime Minister Giorgia Meloni and agreed on a ‘strategic partnership.’ On 11 January 2023, Kishida met with British Prime Minister Rishi Sunak in London, where the two signed a historic joint defence pact. The following day, Kishida met with Canadian Prime Minister Justin Trudeau in Ottawa to discuss trade and other issues. On 13 January, Kishida visited President Joe Biden of the United States in Washington, D.C.; the day earlier Japan's Foreign Minister and Defense Minister met with their American counterparts, where they affirmed the Japan-United States alliance remained unchanged.

Indonesia 

On 27 July 2022 President Joko Widodo kicked off his work agenda in Japan by meeting Prime Minister of Japan Fumio Kishida at the Prime Minister's Building in Tokyo on Wednesday morning local time. According to the press release from the Presidential Secretariat received here, Kishida greeted the president in the front yard and this was followed by the official welcoming ceremony. After listening to the national anthem of each country, Kishida called on Jokowi to check the line-up of honor guards before the delegates of each country introduced themselves, after which they headed to the meeting room for a bilateral meeting.

South Korea 

On South Korea, both Kishida and President Yoon Suk-yeol have taken some steps to both mend and expand ties.  Yoon said that Japan had gone from ‘aggressor to partner.’ in remarks on 1 March 2023.  Kishida also plans to hold a summit for Yoon in Japan, to settle war time labor disputes among other issues, which set to occur on 16 March 2023.

Assassination of Shinzo Abe and cabinet reshuffle 

After the assassination of Shinzo Abe on 8 July 2022, Kishida condemned the assassination, but refused to suspend political campaigning so as to demonstrate that democracy would not be impeded by violence. He later blamed insufficient police protection for allowing the murder to occur. Because of media reports on the ties between the LDP and the Unification Church, a Korean cult accused of scamming Japanese followers (including the suspect's mother) out of much of their wealth, Kishida reshuffled his Cabinet on 10 August 2022, which included removing Abe's brother, Nobuo Kishi, from the role of Minister of Defense. Taro Kono was made the Minister of Digital Affairs. While the majority of members of the LDP, including Shinzo Abe and Nobuo Kishi, were related to the church to various degrees, there were no evidences of Kishida having any direct tie with the church or any of its affiliated entities. However, it was reported in the 1 September issue of Shūkan Bunshun that , the president of a Kumamoto circle for backing Kishida's bidding of the premiership was also a chairperson of a Unification Church-affiliated group which was advocating for building the Japan-Korea Undersea Tunnel. Both Kishida and Nakayama denied any knowledge of the tunnel advocacy group being related to the Unification Church.

Domestic policy 
In November 2022, Kishida instructed his government to increase military spending to 2 percent of Japan's GDP, up from 1 percent previously, by 2027. 

Kishida set child care as his government's priority for the year 2023. He emphasized the potential consequences of declining birth rates in Japan, and stated that his administration would increase monetary child benefits given to parents. He announced a plan to double the country's children-related budget by June 2023, and instructed government ministers in the administration to outline child care plans by the end of March 2023.

In February 2023, Kishida fired an aide after the aide made homophobic comments in local media. According to the report, the now-former aide Masayoshi Arai stated that Japanese people would flee the country if same-sex marriage was permitted. Arai also claimed that Japanese people do not want to have members of the LGBT community as their neighbors.

On 13 March 2023, Kishida’s government ended the request for citizens to wear mask in public, a policy initiated to combat the COVID-19 pandemic in Japan that was made 3 years earlier.

Political views 
Despite being the leader of the moderate Kōchikai faction, Kishida has an affiliation with the parliamentary league of the ultraconservative and nationalist organization Nippon Kaigi similar to many other LDP lawmakers. However, he is also described as a centrist politician.

Economic policy 
During the 2021 LDP presidential race, he called for Japan to strive for a new form of capitalism to reduce income disparity, saying neoliberalism and deregulation have widened economic gaps in society. In a parliamentary session on 20 February 2022 he reiterated that the benefits of growth should not belong to a limited group adding that "[c]apitalism isn't sustainable unless it is something that belongs to all stakeholders".

Foreign relations 
Kishida is seen as dovish on foreign policy and lukewarm about revising Japan's pacifist constitution. Following the political philosophy of his own faction, Kishida has pledged a "humane diplomacy" based on the Peace Constitution, the Japan–U.S. alliance, and the Self-Defense Forces and that he will seek to strengthen Japan–U.S. relations and to promote the free and open Indo-Pacific (FOIP) strategy while counterbalancing Chinese political assertiveness and military presence in the region. Regarding Chinese influence over Taiwan and Hong Kong, Kishida has stated that the Taiwan Strait may be the "next major diplomatic problem" following "China's clampdown on Hong Kong" and that Japan should seek more cooperation with Taiwan.

In 2017, while serving as foreign minister, Kishida pressured China to push North Korea towards denuclearization. During the race for the leadership of the LDP, Kishida also addressed the issue of Japanese abductees by North Korea and supported a summit between Japan and North Korea to end the issue. Kishida also took a stronger stance than other contenders regarding China and North Korea, saying that Japan should strengthen its defenses, while at the same time of recognizing that there is a clash between authoritarianism and democracy in the region, especially with regard to the status of Taiwan.

Fumio Kishida has called on the German government to remove the Statue of Peace in Berlin, which has caused considerable controversy in South Korea.

Nuclear policy 
Kishida is in favor of retaining nuclear power technology, which he says should be considered as a clean energy option, while also calling for the establishment of a $90.7 billion university fund to further stimulate science and promotion of renewable energy.

Being a representative from Hiroshima, Kishida has consistently advocated for Japanese diplomacy to promote nuclear non-proliferation and disarmament within the framework of the Nuclear Non-Proliferation Treaty (NPT). In the wake of the 2022 Russian invasion of Ukraine, Kishida rejected former Prime Minister Shinzo Abe's proposal for Japan to consider hosting U.S. nuclear weapons as a deterrent, calling it "unacceptable" given the country’s stance of maintaining the three nonnuclear principles.

Social issues 
He stated support for discussions toward allowing married Japanese couples to choose between unified single surnames or separate last names, while on the topic of same-sex marriage Kishida has stated he has not come to support it, saying instead that the public's opinion should be understood before the Diet decides. He stated in 2023 that Japan must "be extremely careful in considering the matter as it could affect the structure of family life in Japan". He further stated in the Diet's budget committee on February 28th, 2023, that “I don’t think disallowing same-sex couples to marry is unjust discrimination by the state", despite his former backpedaling and meeting with gay rights activists earlier that month.

Personal life 
In 1988, Kishida married Yuko Kishida, a daughter of a real estate businessman, in an arranged marriage. They have three sons. In one presentation, Yuko was featured in the LDP messaging immediately after he became the de facto PM-designate. He is a fan of the manga series Demon Slayer: Kimetsu no Yaiba and has pledged to financially support the Japanese animation industry during his premiership. He is also a fan of the Hiroshima Toyo Carp baseball team.

Honours 
 : Knight Grand Cross of the Order of Orange-Nassau (29 October 2014).
 : Knight Grand Cross of the Order of Isabella the Catholic (31 March 2017)

References

External links 

 
 MOFA Official Website 
 
 
 YouTube

|-

1957 births
21st-century Japanese politicians
Prime Ministers of Japan
Foreign ministers of Japan
Japanese defense ministers
Knights Grand Cross of the Order of Orange-Nassau
Knights Grand Cross of the Order of Isabella the Catholic
Liberal Democratic Party (Japan) politicians
Living people
Members of Nippon Kaigi
Members of the House of Representatives from Hiroshima Prefecture
People from Hiroshima
Waseda University alumni
Japanese expatriates in the United States